The 2017 Elon Phoenix football team represented Elon University in the 2017 NCAA Division I FCS football season. They were led by first-year head coach Curt Cignetti and played their home games at Rhodes Stadium. They were members of the Colonial Athletic Association (CAA). They finished the season 8–4, 6–2 in CAA play to finish in third place. They received an at-large bid to the FCS Playoffs where they were lost to Furman in the first round.

Preseason poll
First place votes in parentheses

Schedule

Game summaries

at Toledo

at Furman

Charleston Southern

at Richmond

Albany

William & Mary

at Rhode Island

at Villanova

Towson

at New Hampshire

James Madison

FCS Playoffs

Furman–First Round

Ranking movements

References

Elon
Elon Phoenix football seasons
Elon
Elon Phoenix football